Cycling at the 2004 Summer Olympics consisted of 18 events in three disciplines:

Road cycling, held at the Athens historic centre (start and finish at Kotzia Square, for the road race events) and in Vouliagmeni Olympic Centre (for the time trial events).
Track cycling, held at the Olympic Velodrome.
Mountain biking, held at the Parnitha Olympic Mountain Bike Venue.

In total, 464 cyclists participated: these consisted of 334 men and 130 women, from 61 countries. The youngest participant was Ignatas Konovalovas, at 18 years, while the oldest was Jeannie Longo, at 45 years. The most successful contestant was Bradley Wiggins, who won three medals: one gold, one silver and one bronze. The most successful country was Australia, with its team members winning 6 gold and 11 total medals. Russia and Great Britain came in second place with 3 and 2 golds, respectively. After a disqualification, Viatcheslav Ekimov of Russia was awarded his second gold medal in men's time trial, defending his title from 2000, and his third gold medal overall. He achieved his first victory back in 1988, when he competed in men's track pursuit as part of the Soviet team.

Australia dominated track events, winning 5 out of its 6 cycling gold medals there.

Road cycling

Track cycling

Men's

Women's

Mountain biking

Medal table

Records broken

World records
Women's 500 m time trial: Australia's Anna Meares, 33.952 s (20 August)
previous record of 34.000 s was set in August 2002 by Yonghua Jiang
Women's individual pursuit: New Zealand's Sarah Ulmer, 3:24.537 (22 August)
This record was broken multiple times during these Games, the prior instances being:
New Zealand's Sarah Ulmer, 3:26.400 (21 August)
Australia's Katie Mactier, 3:29.945 (21 August)
previous record of 3:30.604 was set in May by Ulmer
Men's team pursuit: Australia's Graeme Brown, Brett Lancaster, Bradley McGee, Luke Roberts, 3:56.610 (22 August)
previous record of 3:59:583 was set in 2002 by Australian team

References

External links
Official result book – Cycling Mountain Bike
Official result book – Cycling Road
Official result book – Cycling Track

 
2004 Summer Olympics events
2004
Olympics
International cycle races hosted by Greece